Soundtrack for the Voices in My Head may refer to three albums by electronic rock band Celldweller:

 Soundtrack for the Voices in My Head Vol. 01, 2008
 Soundtrack for the Voices in My Head Vol. 02, 2010–2012
 Soundtrack for the Voices in My Head Vol. 03, 2016